Jennifer Jason Leigh (born Jennifer Leigh Morrow; February 5, 1962) is an American actress. She began her career on television during the 1970s before making her film breakthrough as Stacy Hamilton in Fast Times at Ridgemont High (1982). She later received critical praise for her performances in Last Exit to Brooklyn (1989), Miami Blues (1990), Backdraft (1991), Single White Female (1992), and Short Cuts (1993).

Leigh was nominated for a Golden Globe for her portrayal of Dorothy Parker in Mrs. Parker and the Vicious Circle (1994). She starred in a 1995 film written by her mother, screenwriter Barbara Turner, titled Georgia. She co-wrote and co-directed a film with Alan Cumming titled The Anniversary Party (2001). Leigh starred in the neo-noir crime drama film Road to Perdition (2002). She starred in the family drama film Margot at the Wedding (2007). She had a recurring role on the Showtime comedy-drama series Weeds as Jill Price-Gray. In 2015, she received critical acclaim for her voice work as Lisa in Charlie Kaufman's Anomalisa, and for her role as Daisy Domergue in The Hateful Eight, for which she was nominated for the Golden Globe and Academy Award for Best Supporting Actress. From 2017 to 2021, she starred in the Netflix comedy-drama series Atypical. Leigh starred in the science-fiction horror films, Annihilation (2018) and Possessor (2020).

For her stage work, Leigh was nominated for a Drama Desk award for her off-Broadway performance as Beverly Moss in Mike Leigh's Abigail's Party. Her Broadway debut occurred in 1998, when she became the replacement for the role of Sally Bowles in the musical Cabaret.

Early life 
Leigh was born in Los Angeles, California. Her father, Vic Morrow (born Victor Morozoff), was an actor, and her mother, Barbara Turner, was a screenwriter. Her parents divorced when she was two. Leigh's birth name was Jennifer Leigh Morrow. She changed her surname early in her acting career, taking the middle name "Jason" in honor of actor Jason Robards, a family friend. Leigh's parents were Jewish; her father's family was from Russia and her mother's from Austria.

Leigh is the middle child of three sisters. Her older sister, Carrie Ann Morrow, who was credited as a "technical advisor" on her 1995 film Georgia, died in 2016. Leigh also has a half-sister, actress Mina Badie (born 'Badiyi' – from her mother's second marriage). Badie acted alongside Leigh in The Anniversary Party. Film director Reza Badiyi became Leigh's stepfather when he married Leigh's mother, Barbara.

Career

1976–1989 
Leigh had a nonspeaking role at the age of nine for her film debut Death of a Stranger (The Execution) (1973). At the age of 14, she attended acting workshops, taught by Lee Strasberg, and the Stagedoor Manor Performing Arts Training Center in Loch Sheldrake, New York. Afterwards, she landed a role in the film The Young Runaways (1978). She also appeared in an episode of Baretta and an episode of The Waltons. Several television films followed, including a portrayal of an anorexic teenager in The Best Little Girl in the World, for which Leigh dropped to  under medical supervision. She made her big-screen debut playing a blind, deaf, and mute rape victim in the 1981 slasher film Eyes of a Stranger; she quit school to star in the film.

In 1982, Leigh played a teenager who gets pregnant in the Cameron Crowe-scripted high-school comedy film Fast Times at Ridgemont High, which served as a launching pad for several of its young stars. While decrying the writing as sexist and exploitative, film critic Roger Ebert was enthusiastic about the acting, singling out Leigh and writing, "Don't they know they have a star on their hands?" With the exception of Ridgemont High and a supporting role in the 1983 comedy film Easy Money alongside Rodney Dangerfield, Leigh's early film work consisted of playing fragile, damaged, or neurotic characters in low-budget horror or thriller genre films. She played a virginal princess kidnapped and raped by mercenaries in Flesh and Blood (1985), an innocent waitress pursued by the psychopathic title character in The Hitcher (1986) (both films pitting her alongside Rutger Hauer), a mentally-disturbed, child-like young woman on the threshold of sexual awakening in the Southern Gothic film Sister, Sister (1987), and a young woman on the verge of a nervous breakdown in Heart of Midnight (1989).

1990–1999 
In 1990, Leigh made a significant career breakthrough when she was awarded New York Film Critics Circle Award for Best Supporting Actress and the Boston Society of Film Critics Award for Best Supporting Actress for her portrayals of two very different prostitutes: the tough streetwalker Tralala who is brutally gang-raped in Last Exit to Brooklyn, and Susie, a teenage prostitute who falls in love with ex-con Alec Baldwin in Miami Blues. Roger Ebert included Last Exit in his list of Best Movies of 1990, calling Leigh's performance brave, though his review of Miami Blues was much less sympathetic, simultaneously criticizing Leigh's ability to play dumb roles and praising her ability to play smart roles. Entertainment Weekly called her "the Meryl Streep of bimbos".

In his 1991 book Cult Movie Stars, Danny Peary described Leigh as "an interesting, always watchable, and extremely talented young actress," summarizing her appeal "For those who believe that the preacher's angelic-looking daughter is as interested in sex as the farmer's daughter. This pretty, sweet-looking blonde has played a number of shy and innocent-looking women who are curious about sex; once they learn, they display wicked imaginations."  Peary added, "Leigh seems too gentle and looks too young and innocent to play the parts she has taken. Her females are either hungry for sex and/or have been psychologically affected by past sexual incidents... Her characters are vulnerable and almost always victimised, but usually they gave surprising resilience, and try to use their bad experiences to make themselves stronger."

Leigh was cast in her first mainstream Hollywood studio film, the firefighter drama Backdraft (1991), in which she played a more conventional role, the girlfriend of lead actor William Baldwin. She found more success in the gritty crime drama Rush (1991), portraying an undercover cop who becomes a junkie and falls in love with her partner, played by Jason Patric. Reviewing Rush, Roger Ebert noted, "Leigh of course is a veteran by now of grubby characters in sleazy films; she has become one of the best young actresses by accepting roles some of her contemporaries would not even consider... After her extraordinary work as a doomed prostitute in Last Exit to Brooklyn, here she is again, looking sweet and wholesome, and descending into a world of people who have forgotten their better natures." Leigh's next film, Single White Female (1992), was a surprise box-office success, bringing Leigh to her largest mainstream audience yet, portraying a mentally-ill woman who terrorizes roommate Bridget Fonda.

Leigh was awarded the MTV Movie Award for Best Villain at the 1993 MTV Movie Awards and nominated for Chicago Film Critics Association Award for Best Actress. Leigh co-starred with Kathy Bates as a tormented, pill-popping woman hiding a history of childhood sexual abuse in the adaptation of Stephen King's novel Dolores Claiborne (1995). Leigh achieved her greatest acclaim in the role of Sadie Flood, an angry, drug-addicted rock singer living in the shadow of her successful older sister (Mare Winningham), in Georgia (1995). Georgia was met with critical praise. James Berardinelli wrote, "There are times when it's uncomfortable to watch this performance because it's so powerful", and Janet Maslin of The New York Times described Leigh's "fierce, risk-taking performance and flashes of overwhelming honesty".

Leigh won New York Film Critics Circle Award for Best Actress and Best Actress from the Montreal World Film Festival, as well as an Independent Spirit Award nomination and Sensual Knife fight nomination Some expressed surprise that she was not nominated for an Academy Award, while Winningham was nominated for an Academy Award for Best Supporting Actress.

Throughout the 1990s, Leigh worked with many independent film directors. She worked with Robert Altman in Short Cuts (1993), playing a phone-sex operator, and Kansas City (1996), as a streetwise kidnapper. Leigh has expressed admiration for Altman and called him her mentor. In a change of pace from her "bad girl" roles, Leigh played the fast-talking reporter Amy Archer in the Coen Brothers' comic homage to 1950s comedy, The Hudsucker Proxy (1994). Leigh took her first lead role as the writer and critic Dorothy Parker in Alan Rudolph's film Mrs. Parker and the Vicious Circle (1994). She received a Golden Globe Award nomination and a National Society of Film Critics Award for Best Actress, as well as Chicago Film Critics Association Award for Best Actress and Fort Lauderdale Film Critics Best Actress Award.

In another change of pace, she starred in Agnieszka Holland's version of the Henry James novel Washington Square (1997), as a mousy 19th-century heiress courted by a gold digger. In 1998, she appeared alongside Campbell Scott in the Hallmark Hall of Fame television movie The Love Letter. In David Cronenberg's eXistenZ (1999), she played a virtual-reality game designer who becomes lost in her own creation.

2000–2009 
Leigh had a brief role as a gangster's doomed wife in Sam Mendes's Road to Perdition (2002) and co-starred as Meg Ryan's brutally murdered sister in Jane Campion's erotic thriller In the Cut (2003). She went on to play Stevie, the prostitute girlfriend of Christian Bale's character in the dark thriller The Machinist (2004). Mick LaSalle of the San Francisco Chronicle commented that "As the downtrodden, sexy, trusting, and quietly funny prostitute, Leigh is, of course, in her element". Her performance as a manipulative stage mother in Don McKellar's film Childstar won her a Genie Award for Best Performance by an Actress in a Supporting Role in 2005.

After many years of wanting to be in a Todd Solondz film, she appeared in Palindromes (2004). She also appeared in the psychological thriller The Jacket (2005), alongside Adrien Brody and Keira Knightley. Leigh appeared in the 2008 ensemble film Synecdoche, New York and has acted in two films written and directed by her then-partner Noah Baumbach: Margot at the Wedding, co-starring Nicole Kidman, and Greenberg. Leigh has said that the roles were not specifically written for her, as Baumbach does not write roles with actors in mind. In 2009, Leigh was cast in the Showtime comedy-drama series Weeds, becoming a regular guest in the eighth season.

Leigh has received three separate career tributes: at the Telluride Film Festival in 1993, a special award for her contribution to independent cinema from the Film Society of Lincoln Center in 2002, and a week-long retrospective of her film work held by the American Cinematheque at Los Angeles's Grauman's Egyptian Theatre in 2001.

2010–present 
Leigh joined the drama series Revenge on ABC in 2012. In 2015, Leigh starred in Quentin Tarantino's western film The Hateful Eight. It is set in Wyoming after the Civil War, and was released on December 25. Leigh, along with the rest of the cast, appeared at the San Diego Comic-Con to promote the film in July 2015. Leigh's performance has received multiple award nominations at various award ceremonies, including her third Golden Globe nomination for Best Supporting Actress in a Motion Picture, her first BAFTA Award nomination for Best Actress in a Supporting Role and her first Academy Award nomination for Best Supporting Actress. In 2017, Leigh was reunited with her Hateful Eight co-star Tim Roth when the pair played a husband-and-wife team of contract killers in six episodes of Showtime's revival of David Lynch and Mark Frost's Twin Peaks. In 2019, Leigh appeared in two episodes of Showtime's last season of The Affair. In 2022, Leigh was cast in a lead role as Lorraine Lyon in the upcoming fifth season of the FX black comedy crime drama anthology series Fargo.

Stage roles 
In 1998, Leigh took on the lead role of Sally Bowles in Sam Mendes's Broadway revival of the musical Cabaret, succeeding Natasha Richardson, who originated the role in Mendes's production. She succeeded Mary-Louise Parker in the lead role in Proof on Broadway in 2001. Her other theatrical appearances include The Glass Menagerie, Man of Destiny, The Shadow Box, Picnic, Sunshine and Abigail's Party. In 2011, she played Bunny in the Broadway revival of House of Blue Leaves in New York City alongside Ben Stiller and Edie Falco.

Writing and directing 
In 2001, Leigh co-wrote and co-directed The Anniversary Party, an independently produced feature film about a recently reconciled married couple who assemble their friends at their Hollywood Hills house, ostensibly to celebrate their sixth wedding anniversary. As the evening progresses, the party disintegrates into emotional confrontations and bitter arguments as the façade of their happy marriage crumbles. Leigh was inspired by her recent experience filming the low-budget Dogme 95 film The King Is Alive. Leigh and co-writer Alan Cumming drew freely from their personal experiences in the writing of the film. Leigh plays an aging actress who makes jokes about her lack of Academy Award nominations and is fearful of losing her bisexual husband (Cumming). The film was shot in 19 days on digital video, and costarred the pair's real-life Hollywood friends, including Kevin Kline, Phoebe Cates, Gwyneth Paltrow, Jennifer Beals, John C. Reilly, Parker Posey, and Leigh's sister Mina Badie. Leigh and Cumming jointly received a citation for Excellence in Filmmaking from the National Board of Review, and were nominated for the Independent Spirit Award for Best First Feature and Independent Spirit Award for Best First Screenplay. The film received generally positive reviews.

Other work 
Leigh filmed a role in Stanley Kubrick's final film Eyes Wide Shut (1999) as a grieving patient of Dr. Bill Harford (Tom Cruise) who declares her love for him after her father's death. Kubrick wanted to reshoot the scenes, but Leigh was unavailable due to scheduling conflicts with eXistenZ; instead, her scenes were cut. Leigh was originally cast as Vincent Gallo's girlfriend in his self-directed film The Brown Bunny, and was apparently prepared to perform oral sex on Gallo as the script required. Leigh subsequently commented that "it just didn't work out" and the role was eventually played by Chloë Sevigny. In 1997, she was featured in Faith No More's music video for "Last Cup of Sorrow". She was selected as one of "America's 10 Most Beautiful Women" by Harper's Bazaar magazine in 1989 and served as a jury member at the 57th Venice International Film Festival in 2000. She narrated the audiobook for Quentin Tarantino 2021´s novelization of Once Upon a Time in Hollywood.

Personal life
In 1982, Leigh's father, Vic Morrow, was accidentally killed along with two child actors when a helicopter stunt went wrong during the filming of Twilight Zone: The Movie. Leigh and her sister filed a wrongful death lawsuit against Warner Bros., John Landis, and Steven Spielberg. They settled out of court a year later.

Leigh has described herself as shy, introverted, and averse to Hollywood publicity and scandal. Speaking about her roles in smaller, independent films, she said, "I'd much rather be in a movie that people have really strong feelings about than one that makes a hundred million dollars but you can't remember because it's just like all the others."

She met independent film writer-director Noah Baumbach in 2001 while starring on Broadway in Proof. The couple married on September 2, 2005. Their son was born on March 17, 2010. Leigh filed for divorce on November 15, 2010, in Los Angeles, citing irreconcilable differences. She sought spousal support as well as primary custody of the couple's son, with visitation for Baumbach. The divorce was finalized in September 2013.

Performances

Film

Television

Stage

Awards

Film 
Short Cuts

 Golden Globe Special Ensemble Cast Award 
 Volpi Cup for Best Ensemble Cast

Mrs. Parker and the Vicious Circle

 Chicago Film Critics Association Award for Best Actress
 National Society of Film Critics Award for Best Actress
 Nominated – Golden Globe Award for Best Actress in a Motion Picture – Drama

Anomalisa

 Nominated - Annie Award for Voice Acting in a Feature Production
 Nominated - Independent Spirit Awards for Best Supporting Female

The Hateful Eight

 Won – Capri Supporting Actress Award
 Won – CinEuphoria Awards for Best Actress
 Won – National Board of Review for Best Supporting Actress
 Won – North Texas Film Critics Association for Best Supporting Actress
 Won – Online Film & Television Association for Best Supporting Actress
 Won – San Diego Film Critics Society Awards for Best Supporting Actress
 Nominated – Academy Award for Best Supporting Actress
 Nominated – Golden Globe Award for Best Supporting Actress – Motion Picture
 Nominated – BAFTA Award for Best Actress in a Supporting Role
 Nominated – AACTA International Award for Best Supporting Actress
 Nominated – Austin Film Critics Association for Best Supporting Actress
 Nominated – Awards Circuit Community Awards for Best Supporting Actress
 Nominated – Broadcast Film Critics Association Awards for Best Supporting Actress
 Nominated – Central Ohio Film Critics Association for Best Supporting Actress
 Nominated – Chicago Film Critics Association Awards for Best Supporting Actress
 Nominated – Dallas-Fort Worth Film Critics Association Awards for Best Supporting Actress
 Nominated – Denver Film Critics Society for Best Supporting Actress
 Nominated – Detroit Film Critics Society Awards for Best Supporting Actress
 Nominated – Florida Film Critics Circle Awards for Best Supporting Actress
 Nominated – Georgia Film Critics Association for Best Supporting Actress
 Nominated – Gold Derby Awards for Best Supporting Actress
 Nominated – Golden Schmoes Awards for Best Supporting Actress of the Year
 Nominated – Houston Film Critics Society Awards for Best Supporting Actress
 Nominated – IndieWire Critics' Poll for Best Supporting Actress
 Nominated – International Cinephile Society Awards for Best Supporting Actress
 Nominated – Kansas City Film Critics Circle Awards for Best Supporting Actress
 Nominated – North Carolina Film Critics Association for Best Supporting Actress
 Nominated – Phoenix Critics Circle for Best Supporting Actress
 Nominated – Seattle Film Critics Awards for Best Supporting Actress
 Nominated – St. Louis Film Critics Association for Best Supporting Actress
 Nominated – Vancouver Film Critics Circle for Best Supporting Actress
 Nominated – Village Voice Film Poll for Best Supporting Actress
 Nominated – Washington D.C. Area Film Critics Association Awards for Best Supporting Actress

Television 
Thanks from a Grateful Nation

 Nominated — Satellite Award for Best Actress – Miniseries or Television Film

Stage 
Abigail's Party

 Nominated — Drama Desk Award for Outstanding Actress in a Play
 Nominated — Lucille Lortel Award for Outstanding Lead Actress

References

Further reading 
 
 "Anima Animus: Jennifer Jason Leigh's Bisexual Method in Last Exit to Brooklyn" by Ian Murphy (article in Alphaville journal)

External links 

 
 
 
 In-depth interview at Museum of Moving Image in 1994 
 Article in Alphaville journal

Living people
Actresses from Hollywood, Los Angeles
American child actresses
American film actresses
American musical theatre actresses
American people of Austrian-Jewish descent
American people of Russian-Jewish descent
American stage actresses
American television actresses
American women film producers
American women screenwriters
Best Supporting Actress Genie and Canadian Screen Award winners
Film producers from California
Jewish American actresses
Lee Strasberg Theatre and Film Institute alumni
Screenwriters from California
Volpi Cup winners
Writers from Los Angeles
20th-century American actresses
21st-century American actresses
21st-century American Jews
1962 births